Surbhi Puranik (born 5 June), professionally known as Surbhi, is an Indian actress who primarily works in Telugu and Tamil films. She made her film debut with the Tamil film Ivan Veramathiri (2013), for which she received SIIMA Award for Best Female Debut - Tamil and Vijay Award for Best Debut Actress nominations.

Surbhi made her Telugu film debut with Beeruva (2015). She has been part of successful films including Express Raja and Gentleman both (2016). She made her Kannada film debut with Sakath (2021).

Early life and education
Surbhi was born as Surbhi Puranik on 5 June in Delhi. She completed her bachelor's degree in Fine Arts from the College of Art, Delhi. Surbhi took up an acting course at Imago Acting School, where she was taught by Barry John and Manoj Bajpai. She then did various modelling assignment before her film debut.

Career

Debut and early success (2013-2018)
Surbhi made her acting debut in 2013 with Ivan Veramathiri. She portrayed a college student opposite Vikram Prabhu in this successful film. Rediff.com wrote, "Surabhi is perfectly cast. She brightens up all the scenes she appears in and seems totally natural and fresh." Hindustan Times said, "Debutant Surabhi can be impressive with some guidance." She received SIIMA Award for Best Female Debut - Tamil and Vijay Award for Best Debut Actress nominations for her performance.

In 2014, she first appeared as a chain smoker in Velaiyilla Pattathari alongside Dhanush. It was one of the most successful Tamil films of the year. Deccan Chronicle noted, "Surabhi in cameo fits the bill." She next appeared in a cameo in Jeeva.  In 2015, she made her Telugu debut and appeared opposite Sundeep Kishan in Beeruva. Times of India wrote, "Surbhi is good in her role but she could have worked better in the drunk scene." 

Surbhi had four releases in 2016. Firstly, she portrayed a dog lover opposite Sharwanand in Express Raja. It was a commercial success. The Hindu noted, "Surbhi looks pretty. Though she has a small role she does her part well." Next, she appeared opposite Jai in Pugazh, a box office average. She then appeared in Attack opposite Manchu Manoj. Her final release of the year came with Gentleman opposite Nani, portraying a young entrepreneur. It become a commercial success at the box office. Firstpost noted, "Surabhi as Aishwarya is simple and naïve, like the character demands." While Deccan Chronicle wrote, "Surabhi looks good on screen and has done her job very well."

She appeared opposite Allu Sirish in her only release of 2017, Okka Kshanam. Firstpost mentioned, "Surbhi, as Allu Sirish's love, fits her role to the T."

Career progression (2019-present)
Surbhi portrayed the lead opposite Vishnu Manchu in the 2019 film Voter. 123 Telugu wrote, "Surabhi looks glamorous and her chemistry with Vishnu Manchu is good too."

Surbhi had two release in 2021. She first portrayed the titular role opposite Aadi in Sashi. Times of India wrote, "Surabhi looked good on screen but could have been more expressive." Surbhi next made her Kannada film debut with Sakath. She portrayed an anchor alongside Ganesh. Times of India stated, "Surbhi is charming in her debut outing."

Filmography

Films

Awards and nominations

References

External links 

 
 

Actresses from Delhi
Living people
Actresses in Tamil cinema
Indian film actresses
21st-century Indian actresses
Actresses in Telugu cinema
Year of birth missing (living people)